Skiljebo SK is a Swedish football club located in Västerås.

Background
Since their foundation on 4 March 1944 Skiljebo SK has participated mainly in the middle and lower divisions of the Swedish football league system.  The club currently plays in Division 2 Norra Svealand which is the fourth tier of Swedish football. They play their home matches at the Hamre IP in Västerås.

Skiljebo SK are affiliated to the Västmanlands Fotbollförbund.

Skiljebo SK has the largest youth activity programme in the province of Västmanland.  The club is the organiser of the ArosCup, an international youth football cup played on grass. The tournament was first held 1978. Over 400 teams participate annually, which means that over 7,500 youngsters competing on over 50 pitches.

Season to season

Attendances

In recent seasons Skiljebo SK have had the following average attendances:

External links
 Skiljebo SK – Official Website
 ArosCup – Soccer tournament in Sweden – Tournament Website

Footnotes

Sport in Västerås
Football clubs in Västmanland County
Association football clubs established in 1944
1944 establishments in Sweden